Clungunford is a village and civil parish in south Shropshire, England, located near the border with Herefordshire.

Village
The village features St. Cuthbert's parish church. The River Clun flows just to the west of the village and can be crossed here by Clungunford Bridge. There are no pubs or shops in present times. The parish council runs the website www.clungunford.com which provides information on up and coming events. 

The village hall ("Clungunford Village Hall"), is managed by a charity and has undergone a full refurbishment in 2019 and has a well stocked bar that is run by a Community Interest Company and is open every Friday night and on other occasions when events are arranged. There is a coffee morning in the hall on the 2nd and 4th Thursdays of the month and a Table Tennis club on Tuesdays. A mobile Post office visits on Thursday for an hour from 11.45 in the car park outsode the Village Hall.

The church (St Cuthbert's) is located on the western edge of the settlement, adjacent to the flood plain of the Clun.

The 740 bus service calls at Clungunford, with 3 buses a day to Ludlow and Knighton.

Etymology
The name derives from when this part of the Clun Valley was owned by the Saxon Lord Gunward and so was called "Clun Gunward" (meaning the place on the Clun owned by Gunward). It is written in the Domesday Book of 1086 as "Clone Gunward". The second part of the Gunward name (the "ward" element) became corrupted over time to become "ford", and it is a common mistake to believe a ford across the river is responsible for this part of the modern place name (although a ford did once exist where the present-day bridge crosses the Clun). Conversely, the nearby hamlet of Broadward has experienced the opposite change – its second element was "ford" and this became "ward".

The village continues to be called by some locals Gunnas - a variation of Gunward. The village's bi-monthly newsletter is called The Gunnas Gazette and a residential cul-de-sac is named Upper Gunnas Close.

History
The Domesday Book (1086) records 36 households in Clungunford, making it a large settlement for its time.

There is an old motte, to the northeast of St Cuthbert's churchyard, which guarded the crossing of the river here during medieval times. It is open to the public via a permissive footpath.

Salusbury Pryce Humphreys, notable officer in the Royal Navy, was born in Clungunford (at the Rectory) in 1778.

The present Clungunford Bridge was built in 1935 and replaced a bridge built in 1657.

Geography
Clungunford lies at an elevation of between 130m and 145m above sea level.

The B4367 road passes through the village and crosses the Clun on Clungunford Bridge.

The nearest market town is Craven Arms,  distant by road.

Parish

Geography
The civil parish of Clungunford (which has an area of ) includes the village of Clungunford, the hamlets of Abcott, Beckjay, Broadward, Hopton Heath (with its railway station) and Shelderton, and a number of outlying farms and houses including Rowton Grange, The Crossways, and part of Twitchen. The population as of the 2011 census was 316.

The River Clun, which flows through the parish from the north to the south, divides the parish into two almost equal parts. The parish borders the county of Herefordshire to the south. The northwest corner of the parish (the locality of Hope, on the east slope of Clunbury Hill) falls within the Shropshire Hills AONB, but the village itself does not.

Neighbouring civil parishes are Clunbury, Craven Arms (formerly Stokesay), Hopesay, Hopton Castle, Leintwardine (Herefordshire), and Onibury.

The parish forms part of the Clun electoral division, which elects one councillor to Shropshire Council, the local council based in the county town, Shrewsbury.

History
A Roman road runs through the eastern half of the parish, through Shelderton, on its way between the Roman fort and settlement at Leintwardine and the city at Wroxeter.

At the time of the Domesday Book, the manor of Clungunford fell within the hundred of Leintwardine, but later came within the hundred of Purslow (the township of Shelderton however fell under Munslow). Abcott, Beckjay, Broadward and Shelderton were medieval townships, whilst Hopton Heath came into being with the coming of the railway in 1861.

In 1884 the parish gained land from Hopton Castle (a part of Lingen Meadow); in 1967 the parish lost land in the southeast (beyond Shelderton Rock) to Onibury parish.

In 1894 it became part of Ludlow Rural District and then in 1974 the non-metropolitan district of South Shropshire. In 2009 there was another re-organisation of local administration, with the creation of a unitary authority (Shropshire Council) covering most of Shropshire.

Council
The parish council has 9 members. The parish has no wards.

In culture
In A Shropshire Lad, A.E. Housman wrote the verse:

See also
Listed buildings in Clungunford

References

External links

Villages in Shropshire
Civil parishes in Shropshire